"Stop the Sun" is a song written and recorded by American country artist, Bonnie Guitar. Recorded in September 1967, the official single was released two months later, peaking at number thirteen on the Billboard Hot Country Singles chart. It was the first time Guitar enjoyed a major hit with a self-penned song. The song was issued on her album, Stop the Sun/A Woman in Love on Dot Records.

Chart performance

References 

1967 singles
Bonnie Guitar songs
Song recordings produced by George Richey
Dot Records singles
1967 songs